Yeung Luen Lin (born 8 February 1956) is a Hong Kong judoka. He competed in the men's extra-lightweight event at the 1984 Summer Olympics.

References

External links
 

1956 births
Living people
Hong Kong male judoka
Olympic judoka of Hong Kong
Judoka at the 1984 Summer Olympics
Place of birth missing (living people)